Gladiolus aladagensis (Turkish: Aladağ kılıçotu) is a species of flowering plant in the family Iridaceae. It is native to Bolu Province, in Northwest Turkey.

Discovery 
This species was discovered by Dr. Mehmet Sağıroğlu of Sakarya University and Dr. İsmail Eker of Bolu Abant İzzet Baysal University when they conducted a field study in Aladağlar.

Etymology 
The name "aladagensis" derives from the Aladağlar region in Bolu, where this species was discovered.

Description 
It is morphologically similar to Gladiolus kotschyanus and Gladiolus italicus.

References 

aldagensis
Endemic flora of Turkey